Cumberland-Hesstown is a census-designated place (CDP) in Cumberland County, New Jersey, United States. Consisting of the unincorporated communities of Cumberland and Hesstown, it is in the eastern part of the county, in the northern part of Maurice River Township. New Jersey Route 49 passes through the CDP, leading northwest  to Millville and southeast  to Tuckahoe.

The area was first listed as a CDP prior to the 2020 census with a population of 315.

Demographics

References 

Census-designated places in Cumberland County, New Jersey
Census-designated places in New Jersey
Upper Deerfield Township, New Jersey